Xiao Liwu (meaning: "Little Gift") is a male giant panda born at the San Diego Zoo on July 29, 2012.

Xiao Liwu is the sixth cub born to his mother Bai Yun, and the fifth for his father Gao Gao. He has one half-sister, Hua Mei, through Bai Yun. He also has two full brothers, Mei Sheng and Yun Zi, and two full sisters, Su Lin and Zhen Zhen. Like his full siblings, he was conceived via natural mating.

He was named on November 13, 2012.

References

External links
 San Diego Zoo's Panda Cam: Meet the Pandas

Individual giant pandas
San Diego Zoo